This article includes a complete videography for the British progressive rock band Pink Floyd.

Over the course of their career, Pink Floyd has released ten official home videos/DVDs and made 31 music videos.

Music videos

Films/Videos

References

Videographies of British artists
Videography
Discographies of British artists
Rock music group discographies